Antidorus may refer to:

Antidorus of Lemnos, 5th century BCE Greek soldier
Antidorus of Cyme, 4th century BCE grammarian